The 1954 Brooklyn Dodgers season was the first season for new manager Walter Alston, who replaced Chuck Dressen, who had been fired during a contract dispute. Alston led the team to a 92–62 record, finishing five games behind the league champion New York Giants.

In addition to Alston, the 1954 Dodgers had two other future Hall of Fame managers on their roster in pitcher Tommy Lasorda and outfielder Dick Williams. First baseman Gil Hodges and reserve infielder Don Zimmer would also go on to successful managerial careers.

Offseason 
 October 1, 1954: Rocky Nelson was traded by the Dodgers to the Cleveland Indians for Bill Abernathie and cash.
 March 28, 1954: Bobby Morgan was traded by the Dodgers to the Philadelphia Phillies for Dick Young and cash.

Regular season 
On July 31, 1954, Joe Adcock hit four home runs off four different Brooklyn Dodgers pitchers, becoming the seventh player in major league history to hit four home runs in one game. Additionally, Adcock hit a double, setting a major league record of 18 total bases.
September 22, 1954: In a game against the New York Giants, Karl Spooner struck out 15 batters in his very first game, setting a Major League record. J. R. Richard would tie the record in 1971.

Season standings

Record vs. opponents

Opening Day Lineup

Notable transactions 
 May 4, 1954: Art Ceccarelli was purchased from the Dodgers by the New York Yankees.
 May 11, 1954: Rocky Nelson was purchased by the Dodgers from the Cleveland Indians.
 June 9, 1954: Wayne Belardi was traded by the Dodgers to the Detroit Tigers for Ernie Nevel, Johnny Bucha, Chuck Kress and cash.

Roster

Player stats

Batting

Starters by position 
Note: Pos = Position; G = Games played; AB = At bats; H = Hits; Avg. = Batting average; HR = Home runs; RBI = Runs batted in

Other batters 
Note: G = Games played; AB = At bats; H = Hits; Avg. = Batting average; HR = Home runs; RBI = Runs batted in

Pitching

Starting pitchers 
Note: G = Games pitched; IP = Innings pitched; W = Wins; L = Losses; ERA = Earned run average; SO = Strikeouts

Other pitchers 
Note: G = Games pitched; IP = Innings pitched; W = Wins; L = Losses; ERA = Earned run average; SO = Strikeouts

Relief pitchers 
Note: G = Games pitched; W = Wins; L = Losses; SV = Saves; ERA = Earned run average; SO = Strikeouts

Awards and honors 
1954 Major League Baseball All-Star Game
Roy Campanella starter
Jackie Robinson starter
Duke Snider starter
Carl Erskine reserve
Gil Hodges reserve
Pee Wee Reese reserve
TSN Major League All-Star Team
Duke Snider

Farm system 

LEAGUE CHAMPIONS: Newport News, Great Falls

Notes

References 
Baseball-Reference season page
Baseball Almanac season page

External links 
1954 Brooklyn Dodgers uniform
Brooklyn Dodgers reference site
Acme Dodgers page 
Retrosheet

 
Los Angeles Dodgers seasons
Brooklyn Dodgers season
Jackie Robinson
1954 in sports in New York City
1950s in Brooklyn
Flatbush, Brooklyn